Yougeen is an unincorporated community in Bee County, in the U.S. state of Texas. It is located within the Beeville micropolitan area.

History
The community started as a part of the McMullen-McGloin colony. Eugenia McGloin donated  of land for a railroad station that she named Yougeen in 1911. A railroad switch and an amusement house were located in the community in 1939. There were two stores in the mid-1960s. Most of its residents moved away and only several scattered houses remained in the community in 2000.

Geography

Education
Yougeen had its own school in 1939. Today, the community is served by the Skidmore-Tynan Independent School District.

References

Unincorporated communities in Bee County, Texas
Unincorporated communities in Texas